This is a list of hospitals in Arkansas.  There were 109 hospitals in the U.S. state of Arkansas in 2020.  Arkansas had a population of 3,017,804 in 2019.

Hospitals

Arkansas State Psychiatric Hospital – Little Rock, Arkansas
Carroll Regional Medical Center – Berryville, Arkansas
Central Arkansas Veterans Healthcare System – Little Rock, Arkansas
Christus Dubuis Hospital – Fort Smith, Arkansas
Cornerstone Specialty Hospital – Little Rock, Arkansas
De Queen Medical Center – De Queen, Arkansas
Encompass Health Rehabilitation Hospital – Fort Smith, Arkansas
Harris Hospital – Newport, Arkansas
John L. McClellan Memorial Veterans Hospital – Little Rock, Arkansas
Mercy Emergency Department – Bella Vista, Arkansas
Mercy Hospital Hot Springs – Hot Springs, Arkansas
Mercy Hospital Northwest Arkansas – Springdale, Arkansas
Mercy Orthopedic Hospital – Fort Smith, Arkansas
North Metro Medical Center – Jacksonville, Arkansas
Northwest Health Emergency Department – Fayetteville, Arkansas
Northwest Medical Center Behavioral Health Unit – Springdale, Arkansas
Northwest Medical Center – Springdale, Arkansas
Northwest Medical Center - Willow Creek Women's Hospital – Johnson, Arkansas
Parkhill The Clinic for Women – Fayetteville, Arkansas
Pinnacle Pointe Hospital – Little Rock, Arkansas
Rebsamen Regional Medical Center – Jacksonville, Arkansas
Regency Hospital – Springdale, Arkansas
Rivendell Behavioral Health Services – Benton, Arkansas
River Valley Medical Center – Dardanelle, Arkansas
Riverview Behavioral Health – Texarkana, Arkansas
NEA Medical Center – Jonesboro, Arkansas
Select Specialty Hospital – Fort Smith, Arkansas
St. Anthony's Healthcare Center – Morrilton, Arkansas
St. Bernards Behavioral Health Hospital – Jonesboro, Arkansas
Stone County Medical Center – Mountain View, Arkansas
Summit Medical Center – Van Buren, Arkansas
Surgical Hospital of Jonesboro – Jonesboro, Arkansas
Vantage Point Behavioral Health Hospital – Fayetteville, Arkansas
Veterans Health Care System of the Ozarks – Fayetteville, Arkansas
Wadley Regional Medical Center – Fort Smith, Arkansas

References

Arkansas
 
Hospitals